Jef Van Damme (born 8 January 1979) has been a Member of the Parliament of the Brussels-Capital Region for the Socialistische Partij Anders since 7 June 2009.

Born in Ghent, he was educated at the University of Antwerp, Université catholique de Louvain and King's College London (MA European Studies, 2003).

In 2017, Van Damme caused controversy when he shouted over and interrupted a speech being made by fellow member of the Brussels Parliament and Vlaams Belang politician Dominiek Lootens-Stael.

References

1979 births
Living people
University of Antwerp alumni
Université catholique de Louvain alumni
Alumni of King's College London
Socialistische Partij Anders politicians
Members of the Parliament of the Brussels-Capital Region
21st-century Belgian politicians